Sam Brazel (born 28 December 1978) is an Australian professional golfer.

Brazel has played on the Asian Tour since 2013.  He won the 2016 UBS Hong Kong Open that was part of the 2016 Asian Tour and the 2017 European Tour. Entering the event, he was ranked 480th in the world. This was his first European Tour victory. The win gives him a two-year exemption on the European Tour.

Professional wins (1)

European Tour wins (1)

1Co-sanctioned by the Asian Tour

Asian Tour wins (1)

1Co-sanctioned by the European Tour

Results in World Golf Championships

"T" = Tied

References

External links

Australian male golfers
Asian Tour golfers
European Tour golfers
Sportsmen from New South Wales
People from Lismore, New South Wales
1978 births
Living people